Charles Trevor Roller (28 February 1865 – 15 November 1912) was an English first-class cricketer active 1885–86 who played for Surrey. He was born in Clapham; died in Eastbourne.

References

1865 births
1912 deaths
English cricketers
Surrey cricketers